The following Confederate States Army units and commanders fought in the Battle of Franklin (1864). The Union order of battle is shown separately.

Abbreviations used

Military rank
 Gen = General
 LTG = Lieutenant General
 MG = Major General
 BG = Brigadier General
 Col = Colonel
 Ltc = Lieutenant Colonel
 Maj = Major
 Cpt = Captain
 Lt = Lieutenant

Other
 w = wounded
 mw = mortally wounded
 k = killed
 c = captured

Army of Tennessee

Gen John B. Hood, Commanding

Cheatham's Corps
MG Benjamin F. Cheatham

Lee's Corps
LTG Stephen D. Lee

Stewart's Corps
LTG Alexander P. Stewart

Cavalry Corps
MG Nathan B. Forrest

Notes

References
Battle of Franklin: Confederate Order of Battle (Civil War Trust)
Johnson's Division - Night attack at Franklin Battlefield Marker
U.S. War Department, The War of the Rebellion: a Compilation of the Official Records of the Union and Confederate Armies; Series I, Volume XLV

American Civil War orders of battle